Blake Ferguson (born 20 March 1990) is a professional rugby league footballer who last played for the Leigh Centurions in the Betfred Championship and Australia at international level.

During his Rugby League career he represented the Indigenous All Stars, Country NSW, and New South Wales in the State of Origin series. He was a part of the NSW Blues team that won the 2019 State of Origin series. He played for the National Rugby League team the Sydney Roosters that won the 2018 NRL Grand Final.

Ferguson is also an amateur boxer.

Background
Ferguson was born in Sydney, Australia on 20 March 1990. A nephew of Solomon Haumono and a cousin of Anthony Mundine, Ferguson is of Aboriginal descent from Wiradjuri people, and is eligible for the Indigenous All Stars.

He played his junior rugby league at Wellington Cowboys and Earlwood Saints.

NRL

Cronulla-Sutherland Sharks

Ferguson was the 2009 Cronulla-Sutherland Sharks season's top try scorer. He was just beaten by Jamal Idris as the rookie of the year at the 2009 Dally M Awards.

Following a clause in his contract that allowed him to leave the Sharks if coach Ricky Stuart left, Ferguson also left the club at the end of 2010.

Canberra Raiders
Ferguson signed a 2-year deal to play with the Canberra Raiders starting from 2011. He was the Raiders top try-scorer for the season.

Following his debut Origin game in 2013 Ferguson's league career took a highly publicised downward spiral following an indecent assault charge. Ferguson finished the 2013 Canberra Raiders season as the club's top try scorer.

Sydney Roosters
In May 2014, Ferguson signed with the Sydney Roosters, who beat out South Sydney Rabbitohs for his services. However, due to Ferguson's guilty verdict in his 2013 indecent assault charge, the NRL in late June 2014 rejected an application for him to join the Sydney Roosters for the remainder of the 2014 NRL season, meaning he had to wait until the 2015 season to play for his new club. As part of his rehabilitation, Ferguson completed a rugby league refereeing course. He was widely seen as the man to replace Sonny Bill Williams, who departed after the 2014 season.

For the 2015 NRL season Ferguson's healthy form led to Wendell Sailor considering him "the second best buy of the season". However, after just one game at fullback, he was moved back to the centres.

Ferguson was part of the Eastern Suburbs team that qualified for the finals in 2017.  In the qualifying final, Ferguson almost cost his side the game when he chose to bat the ball back into play when it was heading to the sideline enabling Brisbane winger Corey Oates to score a try and put Brisbane in front with minutes to play.  Easts went on to win the game in the dying minutes thanks to a Latrell Mitchell try.  In the preliminary final against North Queensland, Ferguson scored a try off a knock on from North Queensland player Justin O'Neill to make the score 16–12 with less than 15 minutes to play in the match and with Eastern Suburbs in control.  In the next play from the restart Ferguson lost the ball after being hit in a good tackle by O'Neill, who had lost the ball moments earlier.  In the following play North Queensland scored courtesy of Kyle Feldt and Easts never recovered losing the match 29–16 in a huge upset.

On 4 July 2018, Ferguson signed a three-year contract to join Parramatta beginning in 2019.  Ferguson rejected a similar offer by Newcastle and wanted a new contract with Eastern Suburbs but the club was only prepared to offer him a one-year deal.

In round 25 of the 2018 season, Ferguson scored his 100th try against his future club from 2019 onwards, the Parramatta Eels. His final game for the Roosters was the 2018 NRL Grand Final, in which it was revealed that he had played the second half with a broken leg.

Parramatta Eels
Ferguson made his debut for Parramatta against Penrith in Round 1 of the 2019 season.  Ferguson scored his first and second try for Parramatta the following week against arch rivals Canterbury in a 36–16 victory.  In Round 5 against Canberra, Ferguson suffered a badly broken nose and bruised ribs in a 19–0 loss.  Ferguson was subsequently ruled out of the following week and missed the club's 51–6 victory over Wests Tigers at the new Western Sydney Stadium.

In Round 15 against Canberra, Ferguson scored 2 tries as Parramatta came from 16–0 down to win 22–16 at TIO Stadium in Darwin.
On 25 July 2019, Ferguson was ruled out of action indefinitely as he had suffered an infection in his knee and required surgery.  Ferguson was only expected to initially miss one match.  It was reported that Ferguson also suffered a bad reaction to antibiotics.  Parramatta coach Brad Arthur spoke to the media saying "His health is our No. 1 priority, We won’t play him until he is 100 per cent fit".

After spending 7 weeks out of action, Ferguson returned to the Parramatta side for their round 24 match against the Brisbane Broncos which Brisbane won 17–16 in Golden Point extra-time at Suncorp Stadium.  Ferguson scored a second half try in the defeat.

At the end of the 2019 regular season, Parramatta finished in 5th place on the table and qualified for the finals.  In the elimination final against Brisbane, Ferguson scored a try as Parramatta won the match 58–0 at the new Western Sydney Stadium.  The victory was the biggest finals win in history, eclipsing Newtown's 55–7 win over St George in 1944.  The match was also Parramatta's biggest win over Brisbane and Brisbane's worst ever loss since entering the competition in 1988.

On 30 September, Ferguson was named at wing for the Australia PM XIII side.

In round 17 of the 2020 NRL season, Ferguson scored his first try of the year as Parramatta defeated the New Zealand Warriors 24–18 at the Central Coast Stadium.  It was Ferguson's first try in nearly 12 months with his previous try coming against Brisbane in the 2019 elimination final.

In round 3 of the 2021 NRL season, he scored two tries in a 28–4 victory over Cronulla-Sutherland.
The following week in round 4, he scored two tries for Parramatta in a 36–22 victory over the Wests Tigers at Stadium Australia. Ferguson then experienced a mid-season form slump, which resulted in him being overlooked for selection in the NSW State of Origin side for Game One of the series, as well as being dropped from the Parramatta side for their Round 12 game against the Newcastle Knights.

After spending seven weeks in the NSW Cup, Ferguson was recalled to the Parramatta side for their round 19 match against Canberra.  Ferguson set up a second half try for Parramatta during the game which they lost 12–10.

In round 24, Ferguson scored two tries for Parramatta in a 22–10 victory over Melbourne.  The win also ended Melbourne's 19-game winning streak.

In week one of the 2021 Finals Series, Ferguson scored two tries for Parramatta in their 28-20 elimination final victory over Newcastle.
Ferguson's final game for Parramatta came the following week as the club lost to Penrith 8–6 in the elimination final.  On 22 September 2021, Ferguson was released by the Parramatta club.

Rugby Union
After being released by the NEC Green Rockets of Japanese Rugby due to pending cocaine possession charges, Ferguson was reportedly set to be offered a contract by the Newcastle Knights for the 2022 NRL season. However, it was later reported Newcastle player Dane Gagai, among others, had informed the club they would walk away from their deals if an offer was made to Ferguson.

Leigh
On 29 April 2022, RFL Championship side Leigh announced that they had signed Ferguson on a one-year deal until the end of the season.
On 23 May 2022, Ferguson made his club debut for Leigh and scored four tries as they defeated Workington Town 58-6.
On 28 May 2022, Ferguson won his first trophy with Leigh, defeating Featherstone 30-16 in the RFL 1895 Cup final at the Tottenham Hotspur Stadium.
On 28 August 2022, Ferguson scored two tries for Leigh in a 42-4 win over Widnes.
On 3 October 2022, Ferguson played for Leigh in their Million Pound Game victory over Batley which saw the club promoted back to the Super League.

Representative career

All Stars
In 2010, he was called up to play for the Indigenous All-Stars, replacing the injured Justin Hodges. In that match he famously ran down Israel Folau. Ferguson was previously managed by his uncle Solomon Haumono and is now managed by Sam Ayoub.

Country
In 2012, Ferguson had one of his best seasons on the field, representing the Country New South Wales rugby league team.

New South Wales
In 2013, Ferguson made his debut for the New South Wales rugby league team in Game I of the 2013 State of Origin series. He had previously been approached by Queensland rugby league team coach Mal Meninga to play for Queensland.

In the 2018 NRL season, Ferguson was not selected for the 2018 State of Origin series with coach Brad Fittler opting to select wingers Josh Addo-Carr and Tom Trbojevic instead.  Fittler had publicly stated to the media before the team selection that NSW needed to change its "selfish culture".  Despite Ferguson's strong 2018 form, the 28-year-old's non-selection was no great shock given the players infamous afternoon at a pub with Josh Dugan five days out from the 2017 series decider.

After missing out on selection for New South Wales in 2018, Ferguson was selected for Game 2 of the 2019 State of Origin series which New South Wales would go on to win 38–6 at Optus Stadium in Perth.
Ferguson was retained for Game 3 of the series which was played at ANZ Stadium in the deciding match.  With 1 minute left of normal time and with the scores at 20–20, Ferguson made a break down the right-hand side of the field and beat the covering tackle of Corey Norman.  Ferguson then passed to James Tedesco who crossed over for the series-winning try with 20 seconds of play left.

Australia
In 2012 he made the Australia train-on squad.

On 6 May 2016, Ferguson made his international debut for Australia against New Zealand in the 2016 Anzac Test, scoring a try on debut.

Boxing
Ferguson made his professional boxing debut on 27 November 2013 in a fight against Luke Turner.

Personal life and controversies

Blake has been disciplined for several incidents of off-field behaviour. At a music festival in November 2012, he was escorted by security staff out of a VIP area after reports that he had been spitting on patrons.  The Raiders refused to answer specific questions about the incident but stated that "We are aware of the incident and Blake has been disciplined internally." He was also fined by the NRL after breaking their drinking policy.

On 17 June 2013, Ferguson was apprehended and charged by police for an alleged Indecent Assault at the Sutherland Shire nightclub 2230. On 6 September 2013 the Canberra Raiders sacked Ferguson. On 11 December 2013, Ferguson was found guilty of June's indecent assault charge. Ferguson had pleaded not guilty arguing that he had mistaken the woman for 'another blonde woman' he had met earlier that evening at a different venue, 'Northies' but Ferguson was found guilty, placed on a good behaviour bond, and ordered to stay away from nightclubs and alcohol. He was also suspended from football for more than 2 years.

He converted to Islam in 2013, after taking his shahada with his cousin, Mundine, who has been a Muslim for many years. He also briefly gave up alcohol.

In December 2017, it was revealed that Ferguson had admitted himself into a rehabilitation centre to overcome a gambling addiction.

On 30 December 2021, Ferguson was arrested in Tokyo for assaulting a patron in a restaurant and for being in possession of cocaine. He was in Tokyo to start a new career with NEC Green Rockets. He was subsequently sacked by the Green Rockets.

References

External links

Parramatta Eels profile
Sydney Roosters profile
Roosters profile
NRL profile

1990 births
Living people
Australia national rugby league team players
Australian Muslims
Australian male boxers
Australian people convicted of indecent assault
Australian rugby league players
Boxers from Sydney
People educated at Endeavour Sports High School
Indigenous Australian rugby league players
Mount Pritchard Mounties players
Rugby league fullbacks
Rugby league wingers
Rugby league centres
Sydney Roosters players
Canberra Raiders players
Cronulla-Sutherland Sharks players
Indigenous All Stars players
Prime Minister's XIII players
Country New South Wales Origin rugby league team players
New South Wales Rugby League State of Origin players
Converts to Islam
Leigh Leopards players
Parramatta Eels players
Rugby league players from New South Wales
Wiradjuri people